The 1979 Lagos State gubernatorial election occurred on 28 July 1979. UPN candidate Lateef Jakande won the election.

Results
Lateef Jakande representing UPN won the election. The election held on 28 July 1979.

References 

Lagos State gubernatorial elections
Lagos State gubernatorial election
Lagos State gubernatorial election